Szoke is a surname. Notable people with the surname include:

Aurelia Szoke (1936–2013), Romanian handball player
Helen Szoke (born 1954), Australian non-profit chief executive
István Szőke (1947–2022), Hungarian footballer
Július Szöke (born 1995), Slovak footballer
Katalin Szőke (1935–2017), Hungarian swimmer
László Szőke (1930–2014), Hungarian footballer
Lonnie Szoke (born 1978), Canadian musician
Marius Szőke (born 1993), Romanian handball player
Nikoletta Szőke (born 1983), Hungarian jazz singer
Péter Szőke (1947–2022), Hungarian tennis player
Sandor Szoke (1926–1990), Australian fencer